Afaq District is a district in Al-Qadisiyyah Governorate, southern Iraq. Its seat is the town of Afak. It has three subdistricts: Afak (عفك), Al-Deir (بدير), and Sumer (سومر).

Districts of Muthanna Governorate